The first regular session of the 144th General Assembly of the U.S. state of Georgia met from Monday, January 13, 1997, at 10:00 am, to Monday, March 28, 1997, at which time both houses adjourned sine die.

The second regular session of the Georgia General Assembly opened at 10:00 am on Monday, January 12, 1998, and adjourned sine die on Thursday, March 19, 1998.

Officers

Senate

Presiding Officer

Majority leadership

Minority leadership

House of Representatives

Presiding Officer

Majority leadership

Minority Leadership

Members of the Georgia State Senate, 1997–1998

Members of the Georgia State House of Representatives, 1997–1998

References

 Members of the General Assembly of Georgia, Senate and House of Representatives, first session of the 1997-98 term
 Members of the General Assembly of Georgia, Senate and House of Representatives, second session of the 1997-98 term
Georgia House of Representatives Legislative Reports 1997-1998

Georgia (U.S. state) legislative sessions
1997 in American politics
1998 in American politics
1997 in Georgia (U.S. state)
1998 in Georgia (U.S. state)